Parliamentary elections were held in Macedonia on 18 October 1998, with a second round on 1 November. VMRO-DPMNE emerged as the largest party, winning 49 of the 120 seats, and later formed a coalition government with Democratic Alternative and the Democratic Party of Albanians.

Electoral system
A new electoral law was passed prior to the election, replacing the system in which 120 members of the Assembly were elected in single-member constituencies, with one in which 35 were elected by proportional representation at the national level, and 85 elected in single member constituencies. In the single-member constituencies, candidates had to receive 50% of votes cast and 33% of the total number of registered voters to win in the first round. If no candidate achieved this requirement, a second round was held between the two candidates with the most votes.

This was the only election to use this system. Prior to the 2002 elections it was replaced by a system in which the country was divided into six constituencies that elected 20 members each by proportional representation.

Results

References

External links
OCSE reports
Official results 

Elections in North Macedonia
Macedonia
1998 in the Republic of Macedonia
Macedonia